The Welch OW-1 and the similar OW-2 were American three-seat open biplanes designed by Orin Welch in the late 1920s.
The OW-1 was powered with a  Curtiss OX-5 and the OW-2 was powered by a  Hispano-Suiza 8A, both of which were water-cooled V-8 aero engines.
Four OW-1s were built (NC817, NC4205, NC5105, NC6838), one of which was converted into the first of two OW-2s. The first OW-2 was later modified into a 5 seater, before being destroyed in a hangar fire in November 1929. The second OW-2 was given the civil registration NC11142.

Specifications

References

1920s United States civil utility aircraft
High-wing aircraft
Aircraft first flown in 1927
Single-engined tractor aircraft